The following lists events that happened during 1922 in Chile.

Incumbents
President of Chile: Arturo Alessandri

Events

November
11 November – 1922 Vallenar earthquake

Births
19 August – Hernán Carvallo (d. 2011)
10 December – Lucía Hiriart
18 December – Carlos Altamirano (d. 2019)

Deaths 
21 August – Enrique Mac Iver (b. 1844)
8 October – Jorge Montt (b. 1845)

References 

 
Years of the 20th century in Chile
Chile